Culardoch (900 m) is a mountain in the Cairngorms of Scotland, located northeast of Braemar in Aberdeenshire.

A smooth and heathery peak southeast of the Munro Ben Avon, its summit provides wide views over Aberdeenshire.

References

Mountains and hills of Aberdeenshire
Marilyns of Scotland
Corbetts